The WWE SmackDown Tag Team Championship is a professional wrestling world tag team championship created and promoted by the American promotion WWE, defended on the SmackDown brand division. It is one of two male tag team championships for WWE's main roster, along with the WWE Raw Tag Team Championship on Raw. The current champions are The Usos (Jey Uso and Jimmy Uso), who are in their fifth reign, which is also the longest reign for the title as well as the longest male tag team title reign in WWE history. The Usos concurrently hold the Raw Tag Team Championship and are recognized as the Undisputed WWE Tag Team Champions.

Unveiled on the August 23, 2016, episode of SmackDown, it was created to be the counterpart title to the then-WWE Tag Team Championship, which became exclusive to Raw as a result of the 2016 WWE draft. That title was subsequently renamed after the crowning of the inaugural SmackDown Tag Team Champions, Heath Slater and Rhyno.

History 

During WWE's original brand split (2002–2011), in which the professional wrestling promotion divided its roster into "brands" where wrestlers were assigned to exclusively perform on each brands' respective weekly television program, the men's world tag team championship of the SmackDown brand was the WWE Tag Team Championship, which was established in 2002 to be the counterpart to the Raw brand's World Tag Team Championship. At WrestleMania 25 in 2009, the titles were unified as the Unified WWE Tag Team Championship, although both titles remained independently active until August 2010 when the World Tag Team Championship was deactivated in favor of the WWE Tag Team Championship, which then became the sole tag team championship in WWE, available to both brands. The first brand split then ended in August 2011.

In July 2016, WWE reintroduced the brand split and during the 2016 draft, reigning WWE Tag Team Champions The New Day (Big E, Kofi Kingston, and Xavier Woods) were drafted to Raw, leaving SmackDown without a tag team title. Over the course of the following month, SmackDown general manager Daniel Bryan stated that he wanted to build up the tag team division before introducing a championship. Immediately following SummerSlam on the August 23, 2016, episode of SmackDown Live, Bryan and SmackDown commissioner Shane McMahon introduced the SmackDown Tag Team Championship; the WWE Tag Team Championship was subsequently renamed Raw Tag Team Championship. An eight-team tournament was then scheduled to determine the inaugural champions, culminating in a final match at Backlash on September 11, 2016. The team of Heath Slater and Rhyno defeated The Usos (Jey Uso and Jimmy Uso) in the tournament final to become the inaugural champions.

In 2019, WWE's developmental territory NXT became the promotion's third major brand when it was moved to the USA Network in September, thus making the NXT Tag Team Championship the third major tag team title for men in WWE. However, this recognition was reversed when NXT reverted to its original function as a developmental brand in September 2021.

During the May 20, 2022, episode of SmackDown, reigning SmackDown Tag Team Champions The Usos (Jey Uso and Jimmy Uso) defeated reigning Raw Tag Team Champions RK-Bro (Randy Orton and Riddle) in a Winners Take All match to claim both championships and become recognized as the Undisputed WWE Tag Team Champions. WWE had billed the match as a championship unification match; however, both titles remain independently active with The Usos being double champions. They defended both titles together across both brands as the Undisputed WWE Tag Team Championship, but began defending the titles separately in January 2023.

Inaugural tournament 

† When Chad Gable suffered a storyline injury after defeating The Usos, American Alpha were removed from the final. The Usos then defeated The Hype Bros at Backlash in a second chance tag team match to replace American Alpha in the final.

Brand designation history 
As its name implies, the championship was established for the SmackDown brand. However, the title is still eligible to switch brands during the annual WWE Draft.

Belt design
When the belts were introduced, they featured the same physical design as the Raw Tag Team Championship, with the differences being that the leather straps were blue as opposed to the former's original black and the plates were silver as opposed to the former's original bronze. The Raw Tag Team Championship belt design was updated on December 19, 2016, with silver plates on red straps to bring both sets of titles more in line with each other. While all other WWE championship belts have been updated to feature customizable side plates for the champion's logos, the Raw and SmackDown tag titles are the only championship belts in the promotion that lack this feature.

Reigns 

The team of Heath Slater and Rhyno were the inaugural champions. The New Day (Kofi Kingston and Xavier Woods) have the most reigns at seven, both as a team and individually, and their seventh is the shortest reign for the title at 3 days (2 days as recognized by WWE); during their first six reigns, Big E was also recognized as champion under the Freebird Rule. The Usos (Jey Uso and Jimmy Uso) have the longest singular reign at + days for their ongoing fifth reign, and they have the longest combined reign at + days. The oldest champion is Shane McMahon, winning the title at 49 years old, while the youngest is Dominik Mysterio when he won it at 24.

The Usos (Jey Uso and Sami Uso) are the current champions in their fifth reign, both as a team and individually. They won the titles by defeating previous champions Rey Mysterio and Dominik Mysterio on July 18, 2021, in Fort Worth, Texas during the Money in the Bank Kickoff pre-show. After winning the Raw Tag Team Championship on the May 20, 2022, episode of SmackDown, The Usos became recognized as the Undisputed WWE Tag Team Champions.

See also
 Tag team championships in WWE

Notes

References

External links 
 Official SmackDown Tag Team Title History

WWE SmackDown
WWE tag team championships